Dichomeris arquata is a moth in the family Gelechiidae. It was described by Hou-Hun Li, Hui Zhen and Wolfram Mey in 2013. It is found in Malawi.

The wingspan is 14–15 mm. The forewings are dark brown, apically diffused with black scales and the costal margin with a greyish yellow spot at the distal one-fourth. The hindwings are grey.

Etymology
The species name refers to the saccal region curved in a semicircular arch and is derived from Latin arquatus (meaning arched).

References

Moths described in 2013
arquata